Wellington Nascimento Silva (born 6 March 1988), known as Wellington Silva, is a Brazilian footballer who plays as a right back for Remo.

After mild prominence in the Flamengo, the player notified and left the team, unilaterally.

Career

Flamengo career statistics
(Correct )

according to combined sources on the Flamengo official website.

Honours

Fluminense
Primeira Liga: 2016

Bahia
Copa do Nordeste: 2017

Remo
Copa Verde: 2021

References

External links

Profile 
Contract  

1988 births
Living people
Footballers from Rio de Janeiro (city)
Brazilian footballers
Association football defenders
Campeonato Brasileiro Série A players
Campeonato Brasileiro Série B players
Campeonato Brasileiro Série C players
Campeonato Brasileiro Série D players
Grêmio Foot-Ball Porto Alegrense players
Olaria Atlético Clube players
Resende Futebol Clube players
Madureira Esporte Clube players
CR Flamengo footballers
Fluminense FC players
Sport Club Internacional players
Esporte Clube Bahia players
Centro Sportivo Alagoano players
Boavista Sport Club players